Sanjog (Hindi: संजोग, destiny, luck) is a Bollywood film. It was released in 1943.

Cast
Mehtab
Noor Mohammed Charlie
Ulhas
Wasti
Anwar Hussain

References

External links
 
 Sanjog (1943) on YouTube
 Sanjog (1943) on indiancine.ma

1943 films
1940s Hindi-language films
Films directed by A. R. Kardar
Indian black-and-white films
Indian comedy-drama films
1943 comedy-drama films